Ivo Strejček (born 11 January 1962)
is a former Czech politician and Member of the European Parliament with the Civic Democratic Party, part of the European Conservatives and Reformists. He sat on the European Parliament's Committee on Economic and Monetary Affairs.

He was a substitute for the Committee on International Trade and a member of the Delegation to the EU–Croatia Joint Parliamentary Committee.

Early life
Strejček was born in Nové Město na Moravě. In 1985 he was awarded the Doctor of Pedagogy degree, and in 1994 a Master's degree, both from what is now Masaryk University, Brno.

Career
 2002-2004: Teacher (1986–1996)
 1998-2000: Owner of a small business
 since 1992: Member of ODS (Civic Democratic Party)
 1998-2004: Chairman of the Žďár nad Sázavou local association of ODS
 since 2001: Member of the Jihlava regional council of ODS
 since 2002: Member of the ODS executive council
 1998-2002: Member of Žďár nad Sázavou Town Council
 Member of Žďár nad Sázavou Town Board and member of Žďár nad Sázavou Town Council
 2002-2004: Adviser to the Vice-Chairwoman of the Chamber of Deputies of the Parliament of the Czech Republic
 1996-1997: Press spokesman of the Prime Minister of the Czech Republic
 2002-2004: Adviser to the Vice-Chairwoman of the Chamber of Deputies of the Parliament of the Czech Republic for ODS

See also
2004 European Parliament election in the Czech Republic

References

External links
 
 

1962 births
Living people
Civic Democratic Party (Czech Republic) MEPs
MEPs for the Czech Republic 2004–2009
MEPs for the Czech Republic 2009–2014
Masaryk University alumni
People from Nové Město na Moravě